is a Japanese manga series written and illustrated by Shinichi Fukuda. It began serialization in Square Enix's Young Gangan in January 2018, and has been compiled into ten volumes . An anime television series adaptation produced by CloverWorks aired from January to March 2022. A sequel has been announced.

As of March 2023, the manga had 8.5 million copies in circulation.

Premise
Wakana Gojo's passion for crafting hina dolls had led him to hide his interests due to social trauma. However, when his classmate Marin Kitagawa discovered his talent, she saw beyond his apparent idiosyncrasies and encouraged him to create cosplay costumes. With Marin's unwavering support, Wakana stepped out of his seclusion and began to gain confidence. Working together, they created unique and beautiful costumes showcasing their talents and true selves.

Characters
 
 
 A first-year high school student. Wakana has a large physique and is over 180 cm tall, but he has low self-esteem and is reclusive due to a bitter memory of being criticized by his female classmate, who thought a boy should not be playing with girl dolls. Likewise, he hid his doll-making hobbies and had no friends until he met Marin. Thanks to Marin's encouragement and support, Wakana stepped out of his comfort zone and embraced his love for crafting. He grew more confident with each project, and through their collaboration, Wakana found a sense of belonging in the cosplay community that he had never experienced before.
 
 
 A beautiful girl with the appearance of a gyaru, notable for her warmth, friendliness, positivity, and outgoing nature. Marin is shown to dislike overly critical people who judge others based on their interests, prompting her to reject the advances of a boy who made fun of her liking anime. After a series of successful cosplay, Marin grows closer to Wakana and eventually realizes she is in love with him. She continually does whatever she can to invite him to different places and spend time with him. She usually lives alone as her mother died when she was a child and her father is often away due to work.
 
 
She is a sophomore at an all-girls private high school. However, despite being a year older than Wakana and Marin, Sajuna's youthful petite appearance was mistaken for a junior high or elementary student. On the other hand, she is outspoken and proactive, similar to Marin, who will go to great lengths to achieve her goals. Sajuna cherishes her younger sister Shinju and does all she can to make her happy. Like Marin, she is a fan of cosplay.
 
 
 Sajuna's younger sister. Shinju is a junior high school student, but compared to her sister's petite figure, she is so big that she could almost fit into Wakana's uniform. She is 178 cm tall and has voluptuous curves, because of which she is sometimes mistaken for an adult. However, despite her imposing physique, she is remarkably timid. Shinju is close to her sister and holds her in high regard. When Sajuna cosplays, Shinju assumes the role of a photographer, using a camera borrowed from their father. She is also skillful at using a computer, processing and uploading the images she takes. While Shinju secretly wishes to cosplay herself, she fears falling short of her sister's high standards. Nevertheless, she starts to cosplay after some encouraging from the others.

Production
Shinichi Fukuda set Wakana as an orphan without friends in order to create a situation where he has to solve problems with Marin, instead of his parents or other friends.

Media

Manga
Written and illustrated by Shinichi Fukuda, the series began serialization in Young Gangan on January 19, 2018. The individual chapters are collected and published by Square Enix, with ten tankōbon volumes being released . An official fan book was released on September 24, 2022.

During the Anime Expo in July 2019, Square Enix announced the English version of the series under the title My Dress-Up Darling and published it under its new publication imprint Square Enix Manga & Books.

Volume list

|}

Anime
An anime television series adaptation was announced in the ninth issue of Young Gangan, which was published on April 16, 2021. It was produced by CloverWorks and directed by Keisuke Shinohara, with Yoriko Tomita handling the series' scripts, and Kazumasa Ishida designing the characters and serving as chief animation director. Takeshi Nakatsuka composed the series' music. It aired from January 9 to March 27, 2022, on Tokyo MX and other networks.

Funimation licensed the series outside of Asia. On January 28, 2022, Funimation announced that the series would receive an English dub, which premiered the following day. Following Sony's acquisition of Crunchyroll, the dub was moved over to Crunchyroll. Muse Communication licensed the series in Southeast Asia.

A sequel was announced on September 17, 2022, via the anime's official Twitter account.

Episode list

Reception

Accolades 
In August 2019, the series was ranked sixth in the print manga category according to the votes for the fourth edition of the Next Manga Award, organized by Da Vinci magazine from Media Factory and the Niconico website.

The manga was ranked sixteenth for readers in the 2020 edition of the Kono Manga ga Sugoi! guide from Takarajimasha.

The manga was ranked third in Honya Club's Nationwide Bookstore Employees' Recommended Comics of 2020, a survey that collected results from 1,100 professional bookstore employees in Japan.

Sales 
In February 2022, it was reported that the manga had an additional 1.5 million copies in circulation following the premiere of the anime adaptation. In June 2022, it was announced the manga had over 7 million copies in circulation. In September 2022, it was announced the manga had 7.5 million copies in circulation. As of March 2023, the manga had 8.5 million copies in circulation.

Critical reception

Explanatory notes

References

External links
 Sono Bisque Doll wa Koi o Suru on the official Young Gangan website 
 My Dress-Up Darling on the official Square Enix website
 My Dress-Up Darling anime official website 
 

2022 anime television series debuts
Anime series based on manga
Aniplex
CloverWorks
Cosplay
Crunchyroll anime
Gangan Comics manga
Gyaru in fiction
Muse Communication
Romantic comedy anime and manga
School life in anime and manga
Seinen manga
Slice of life anime and manga
Tokyo MX original programming